The Conversion of Saint Bavo is an altarpiece by Peter Paul Rubens, dated 1623–1624. It was commissioned as the high altarpiece for Sint-Baafskathedraal in Ghent by bishop Antoon Triest (1577–1657). It is still sited in the cathedral. An oil sketch for it is now in the National Gallery, London.

Bibliography

Vlieghe, Hans, Saints (Corpus Rubenianum Ludwig Burchard, 8), nr. 72, Arcade, Brussel, 1972
Gent, duizend jaar kunst en cultuur, Bijlokemuseum, Gent, 1975

1624 paintings
Paintings by Peter Paul Rubens
Religious paintings
Paintings by Peter Paul Rubens in the National Gallery, London
Paintings in Ghent